Pragati Maidan is a venue for large exhibitions and conventions in the city of New Delhi, India. It has an area of nearly 150 acres (more than 625,000m2) of exhibition space, being among the biggest exhibition centers in India.

It is owned, operated, controlled and managed by India Trade Promotion Organization (ITPO), the trade promotion agency of the Ministry of Commerce and Industry, Govt. of India. It is entirely under redevelopment since 2018 along with the ambitious under construction India International Convention and Expo Centre in Dwarka, Delhi.

History
The overall layout and project was designed by architect Raj Rewal. It was inaugurated on 3 November 1972 by then Prime Minister Indira Gandhi, on the eve of the International Trade Fair called Asia 72. The venue and the event were meant to celebrate 25 years of India's Independence.

It is a huge complex of buildings, covering over  sprinkled with many lawns, overlooking the historic Purana Qila, which stands opposite Gate no 1. These fine examples of post-independence architecture have been included on the World Monuments Fund's 2018 list of monuments at risk to highlight their importance and need for protection.

The complex houses many pavilions like the Nehru Pavilion, the Defence Pavilion, the Indira Pavilion, and the Son of India Pavilion. It has various building which are built in various shapes and sizes. It also has an auditorium where rock shows and plays are held quite frequently. There is also an internal shuttle service for those who do not wish to walk. Pragati Maidan used to house a movie theatre called Shakuntalam, quite popular among college kids for its comparatively cheap tickets. The complex houses 18 exhibition halls, several buildings, eateries, performance spaces and compounds, including headquarters of the India Trade Promotion Organisation (ITPO), and hosts over 70 national and international exhibitions annually, with the largest being the India International Trade Fair which attracts over 10,000 exhibitors and over 30,00,000 visitors.

Pragati Maidan is flanked by Mathura Road to its West and Bhairon Road on the South. To its east runs the main railway line to Central and Southern India.  Pragati Maidan is situated in Central Delhi in the  pincode area of 110001. Pragati Maidan offers about 61,290 sq. metres of covered exhibition space in 16 halls, besides 10,000 sq. metres of open display area.

In 2006, ahead of the 2010 Commonwealth Games, a Rs 1,260-crore redevelopment plan was initiated by the government. Pragati Maidan may house a new convention centre that would be five to eight times bigger in capacity than Vigyan Bhavan.

Recurring events

This complex houses five permanent exhibitions which include the Nehru Pavalion, Atomic Energy and Defense Pavilion.  Some of the events held in Pragati Maidan are the India International Trade Fair, World Book Fair and the Auto Expo.

The two-week-long India International Trade Fair (IITF) begins here each year on 14 November. In 1999, during the fair, two new air-conditioned halls 12 and 13 on an area of 9,000 sq. m. were opened to public, when some 5,200 enterprises, over 70 companies from 14 countries set up shop. The 2003 IITF saw 25 lakh visitors to Pragati Maidan. Today, Northern Railways runs special trains to Pragati Maidan during the annual fair, as does the Delhi Metro, which handled an average daily ridership of 50,000 commuters during the 2008 fair.

At a corner of Pragati Maidan, on Mathura Road lies "Matka Peer" or the dargah shrine of Hazrat Sheikh Abubakr Tusi Qalandari, a mystic who came to Delhi from Iran, around the 1260s CE. Further down on Bhairon road, lies the National Handicrafts and Handlooms Museum and further down stands the National Science Centre. The Pragati Maidan Delhi Metro station which is the largest station on the section built over an area of 6,800 square metres, opened in November 2006, during the ongoing India International Trade Fair, and on the eight day, over 2 lakh passenger used the facility.

Each year, the Income Tax Department opens over 150 counters for filing Income Tax returns. It also hosted Wills Lifestyle Indian Fashion Week (WIFW) of the Fashion Design Council of India (FDCI), in 2008 and 2009., apart from exhibitions of almost all major industries, from toys, leather, lifestyle products and services, exports to medical equipment and sports equipments, and even a job fair.

Accessibility
Hazrat Nizamuddin railway station is 3 km from Pragati Maidan.
The best way to reach Pragati Maidan is by Delhi Metro. Get down at the Supreme Court metro station which is located at gate number 10.

Images of Old Complex

See also
Hall of Nations - Demolished in 2017
Neighbourhoods of Delhi
Auto Expo
Pragati Maidan railway station

References

External links
 Pragati Maidan Events Information 
 Indian Trade Promotion Organisation (ITPO), website
 Indian Trade Promotion Organisation (ITPO) Official Video Channel On Veblr
 CII India Trade Fair

Convention centres in India
Buildings and structures in New Delhi
Buildings and structures completed in 1982
Maidans in India
Government buildings in Delhi
1982 establishments in Delhi
20th-century architecture in India